Doug Clarey (born April 20, 1954) is an American former professional baseball infielder. He played one season in Major League Baseball (MLB), appearing in nine games for the 1976 St. Louis Cardinals.

Biography
Clarey played high school baseball at Homestead High School in Cupertino, California. He was selected by the Minnesota Twins in the sixth round of the 1972 MLB draft. He then played for Twins' farm teams during the 1972 to 1974 seasons. In December 1974, the St. Louis Cardinals selected Clarey from the Twins in the Rule 5 draft. During the 1975 season, Clarey played for the Arkansas Travelers at the Double-A level, batting .206 with three home runs and 44 RBIs in 130 games.

In 1976, Clarey played in nine games for the Cardinals, his only major league appearances. He played three games with St. Louis in April, one in May, two in July, and three in August, entering two games as a pinch hitter, two games as a pinch runner, and the other games as a substitute second baseman. In four at bats, he recorded one hit, which came against the San Francisco Giants on April 28. In the top of the 16th inning of a 2–2 tie game at Candlestick Park, Clarey pinch hit for pitcher Mike Proly. Facing pitcher Mike Caldwell with a runner at first base and two outs, Clarey hit a home run, putting St. Louis ahead, 4–2. Reliever Danny Frisella replaced Clarey for the bottom of the inning, retiring the side in order.

Clarey also played for two St. Louis farm teams during 1976, then during the 1977 preseason was traded to the New York Mets organization, in exchange for outfielder Benny Ayala. Clarey played in 28 games for the Tidewater Tides, the Mets' Triple-A affiliate, batting .125 with three home runs and nine RBIs. He finished the season with a Double-A affiliate of the Milwaukee Brewers. In his final professional season, Clarey played for a Double-A affiliate of the Baltimore Orioles in 1978. Overall, in seven minor league seasons, Clarey batted .225 in 666 games, with 53 home runs and 288 RBIs. Defensively, he played 415 games at second base, 179 games at third base, and 53 games at shortstop.

References

Further reading

Dennis Snelling: A Glimpse of Fame, McFarland & Company, Jefferson N.C., 1993, pp. 151–165

External links

1954 births
Living people
Baseball players from Los Angeles
St. Louis Cardinals players
Melbourne Twins players
Geneva Twins players
Wisconsin Rapids Twins players
Arkansas Travelers players
Tulsa Oilers (baseball) players
St. Petersburg Cardinals players
Holyoke Millers players
Tidewater Tides players
Charlotte O's players